The 2018 China Open was a tennis tournament played on outdoor hard courts. It was the 19th edition of the China Open for the men (22nd for the women). It was part of ATP World Tour 500 series on the 2018 ATP World Tour, and the last WTA Premier Mandatory tournament of the 2018 WTA Tour. Both the men's and the women's events were held at the National Tennis Center in Beijing, China, from October 1 to October 7, 2018.

Points and prize money

Point distribution

Prize money

ATP singles main-draw entrants

Seeds

 1 Rankings are

Other entrants
The following players received wildcards into the singles main draw:
  Marcos Baghdatis
  Feliciano López
  Wu Yibing

The following player received entry as a special exempt:
  João Sousa

The following players received entry from the qualifying draw:
  Radu Albot
  Matteo Berrettini
  Dušan Lajović
  Vasek Pospisil

The following player received entry as an alternate:
  Malek Jaziri

The following player received entry as a lucky loser:
  Tennys Sandgren

Withdrawals
Before the tournament
 Pablo Carreño Busta → replaced by  Andreas Seppi
 Ryan Harrison → replaced by  Tennys Sandgren
 John Isner → replaced by  Mischa Zverev
 Andy Murray → replaced by  Malek Jaziri
 Rafael Nadal → replaced by  Peter Gojowczyk

During the tournament
 Fabio Fognini

ATP doubles main-draw entrants

Seeds

 Rankings are

Other entrants
The following pairs received wildcards into the doubles main draw:
  Gong Maoxin /  Zhang Ze
  Hua Runhao /  Zhang Zhizhen

The following pair received entry from the qualifying draw:
  Denys Molchanov /  Igor Zelenay

WTA singles main-draw entrants

Seeds
The following are the seeded players. Seedings are based on WTA rankings .

Other entrants 
The following players received wildcards into the singles main draw:
  Duan Yingying
  Samantha Stosur
  Wang Qiang
  Wang Yafan
  Zheng Saisai

The following players received entry using a protected ranking into the singles main draw:
  Timea Bacsinszky
  Laura Siegemund

The following players received entry from the qualifying draw:
  Katie Boulter
  Zarina Diyas
  Polona Hercog
  Ons Jabeur
  Andrea Petkovic
  Yulia Putintseva
  Kateřina Siniaková
  Dayana Yastremska

The following players received entry as lucky losers:
  Sorana Cîrstea
  Bernarda Pera

Withdrawals 
Before the tournament
  Ashleigh Barty → replaced by  Sorana Cîrstea and  Bernarda Pera
  Agnieszka Radwańska → replaced by  Kirsten Flipkens
  Maria Sharapova → replaced by  Petra Martić
  Serena Williams → replaced by  Ekaterina Makarova
  Venus Williams → replaced by  Aleksandra Krunić

During the tournament
  Madison Keys

Retirements 
  Simona Halep
  Daria Kasatkina
  Lesia Tsurenko

WTA doubles main-draw entrants

Seeds

1 Rankings are

Other entrants
The following pairs received wildcards into the doubles main draw:
  Duan Yingying  /  Wang Yafan
  Johanna Konta  /  Zhang Shuai

The following pairs received entry as alternates:
  Alizé Cornet /  Petra Martić
  Magda Linette /  Zheng Saisai

Withdrawals
Before the tournament
  Daria Gavrilova
  Wang Qiang

Champions

Men's singles

  Nikoloz Basilashvili def.  Juan Martín del Potro, 6–4, 6–4

Women's singles

 Caroline Wozniacki def.  Anastasija Sevastova, 6–3, 6–3

Men's doubles

  Łukasz Kubot /  Marcelo Melo def.  Oliver Marach /  Mate Pavić, 6–1, 6–4

Women's doubles

  Andrea Sestini Hlaváčková /  Barbora Strýcová def.  Gabriela Dabrowski /  Xu Yifan, 4–6, 6–4, [10–8]

References

External links
Official Website

 
2018
2018 ATP World Tour
2018 WTA Tour
2018 in Chinese tennis
October 2018 sports events in China